Samut Prakarn SAT Stadium (Keha Bang Phli) is a multi-purpose stadium in Bang Phli, Samut Prakan, Thailand. It is mostly used for football matches and currently the home stadium of Samut Prakan, competing in the Thai League 4.  The stadium holds the capacity of 5,100 spectators, recorded in 2017.

Samut Prakan City moved into the stadium for the 2019 season and made some changes to the stadium layout, building some terracing behind the goals so that fans would be closer to the pitch, and not behind the running track.

References

Football venues in Thailand